The RTX2010, manufactured by Intersil, is a radiation hardened stack machine microprocessor which has been used in numerous spacecraft.

Characteristics

It is a two-stack machine, each stack 256 words deep, that supports direct execution of Forth. Subroutine calls and returns only take one processor cycle and it also has a very low and consistent interrupt latency of only four processor cycles, which lends it well to realtime applications.

History
In 1983, Chuck Moore implemented a processor for his programming language Forth as a gate array. As Forth can be considered a dual stack virtual machine, he made the processor, Novix N4000, as a dual-stack machine. In 1988, an improved processor was sold to Harris Semiconductor, who marketed it for space applications as the RTX2000.

Example spacecraft that use the RTX2010
 Advanced Composition Explorer (ACE)
 NEAR/Shoemaker
 TIMED
 Rosetta's lander - Philae

External links

  Intersil's product page.

 

 

Avionics computers
Radiation-hardened microprocessors
Stack machines